Lek Mazi Ladaki is a Marathi serial which aired on Star Pravah.

Plot
The series focuses on the relationship between a mother and her daughter. Iravati arranges for her daughter Sanika to be married to Saket. All's well with them until Sanika finds out about Meera, who lives in Saket's house. Iravati must come to terms with her feelings when she realizes that Meera is the daughter she had in her teens, whom she believed dead.

Cast 
 Sayali Deodhar as Meera 
 Aishwarya Narkar as Iravati 
 Nakshatra Medhekar as Sanika 
 Vikas Patil as Saket
 Avinash Narkar as Jaydev 
 Chetan Vadnere as Siddhant 
 Pradeep Welankar as Karnal
 Rajani Welankar as Sudha
 Varad Chavan as Vijay Kirtidar
 Siddhi Karkhanis as Rashmi 
 Ashutosh Kulkarni as Hrishikesh
 Uma Sardeshmukh as Sushila
 Sunil Barve as Aditya Samant
 Smita Saravade / Pournima Talwalkar as Vatsala
 Prasad Pandit as Lokhande
 Poornima Ahire as Chanda
 Shantanu Moghe as Satya
 Harsha Gupta

Adaptations

References

External links 
 Lek Mazi Ladaki at Disney+ Hotstar 
 

Marathi-language television shows
Star Pravah original programming
2016 Indian television series debuts
2018 Indian television series endings